The canton of Thorigny-sur-Oreuse is an administrative division of the Yonne department, central France. It was created at the French canton reorganisation which came into effect in March 2015. Its seat is in Thorigny-sur-Oreuse.

It consists of the following communes:
 
La Chapelle-sur-Oreuse
Compigny
Courlon-sur-Yonne
Cuy
Évry
Gisy-les-Nobles
Michery
Pailly
Perceneige
Plessis-Saint-Jean
Saint-Denis-lès-Sens
Serbonnes
Sergines
Soucy
Thorigny-sur-Oreuse
Vinneuf
Voisines

References

Cantons of Yonne